Parachute Creek is a  tributary of the Colorado River in Garfield County, Colorado. The confluence with the Colorado is just south of the community of Parachute and east of U.S. Route 6.

See also
 List of rivers of Colorado
 List of tributaries of the Colorado River

References

Rivers of Colorado
Rivers of Garfield County, Colorado
Tributaries of the Colorado River in Colorado